Nemo is a free and open-source software and official file manager of the Cinnamon desktop environment. It is a fork of GNOME Files (formerly named Nautilus).

History 
Nemo version 1.0.0 was released in July 2012 along with version 1.6 of the Cinnamon, reaching version 1.1.2 in November 2012. It started as a fork of the GNOME file manager Nautilus v3.4 after the developers of the operating system Linux Mint considered that "Nautilus 3.6 is a catastrophe".
Developer Gwendal Le Bihan named the project "nemo" after Jules Verne's famous character Captain Nemo, who is the captain of the Nautilus.

Features 
Nemo v1.0.0 had the following features as described by the developers:

Uses GVfs and GIO
All the features Nautilus 3.4 had and which are missing in Nautilus 3.6 (all desktop icons, compact view, etc.)
Open in terminal (integral part of Nemo)
Open as root (integral part of Nemo)
File operations progress information (when copying or moving files, one can see the percentage and information about the operation on the window title and so also in the window list)
Proper GTK bookmarks management
Full navigation options (back, forward, up, refresh)
Ability to toggle between the path entry and the path breadcrumb widgets
Many more configuration options
Ability to SSH into remote servers
Native support for FTP (File Transfer Protocol) and MTP (Media Transfer Protocol)
Setting for reverse sorting order. Toggling this setting might be necessary to show the newest files first in a chronological sort. On older versions, this setting could be missing from the graphical settings user interface, but can be enabled through dconf-editor or the gsettings set org.nemo.preferences default-sort-in-reverse-order true command, and undone using the same command with false.

See also 
 Comparison of file managers

References

External links
 Introducing Nemo (2012)
 Install Nemo File Manager in Ubuntu (2012)

Free file managers
2012 software
File managers that use GTK
Software forks
Software that uses Meson